Domonic Patten, known professionally as Tisakorean, is an American rapper, record producer, and dancer. He released his breakout single in 2018.

Early life
Domonic Patten was born in Southwest Houston, Texas. In middle school, he moved to Missouri City, Texas. Throughout high school, which Tisakorean has called "the most crazy [sic] moment of my life", he DJed at parties and was voted "best dressed" by his classmates in his senior year. He attended Prairie View A&M University as a nursing student with intentions of DJing more. His grades suffered due to his frequent partying and he dropped out by his freshman year. Soon after, he learned how to produce music on Logic Pro, and would send beats of his to friends, most of whom turned them down.

Career
Tisakorean released his debut mixtape, Stupid Dumb Geek, in 2017. He released his breakout single, "Dip", in 2018, which went viral on Instagram and other social media platforms and was later released through Atlantic Records. He released his second mixtape, A Guide to Being a Partying Freshman, in March 2019, and a second mixtape, Soapy Club, in July 2019. In May 2019, he was featured on Chance the Rapper's single "Groceries". Also in 2019, he released his single "The Mop". His album, Wasteland, containing his single "The Mop," was released on December 4, 2020 through Ultra Records via Sony Music and signed by A&R Leigha Healy. In October 2021, he released his single "Silly Dude". Tisakorean's mixtape, Mr. Sillyflow, was also released in October 2021.

Artistry
Tisakorean's music has been described as dance rap. He primarily uses Logic Pro to produce his music, which he does at his mother's house. He has stated that he is mostly inspired by Pharrell Williams, also comparing his own beats to those of Soulja Boy. Ben Dandridge-Lemco of The Fader described Tisakorean's beats as "sparse and dissonant".

Discography

Singles

As lead artist

As featured artist

References

American rappers
American dancers
Living people
Year of birth missing (living people)